Freakbeat for the Beatfreaks is a mixtape CD by the electronic artist Bassnectar/Lorin. It was released in 2001 through Amorphous Music. The album is his second mixtape release, and the first of which to be released on CD.

Track listing

External links 
http://www.discogs.com/Bassnectar-Freakbeat-For-The-Beatfreaks-/release/3289624

2001 albums
Bassnectar albums